Siege of Tabriz or capture of Tabriz may refer to:

Siege of Tabriz (1501)
Battle of Tabriz (1514)
Ottoman capture of Tabriz (1603)
Siege of Tabriz (1908–1909)
Russian occupation of Tabriz (1909–1918)
Tabriz during World War I, briefly captured by the Ottomans in 1915